Borgo Mantovano is a comune (municipality) in the Province of Mantua in the Italian region Lombardy.

It was established on 1 January 2018 by the merger of the municipalities of Pieve di Coriano, Revere and Villa Poma.

References